Gunning Bedford may refer to:

 Gunning Bedford Sr. (1742–1797), American lawyer and Governor of Delaware
 Gunning Bedford Jr. (1747–1812), American lawyer and delegate to the Constitutional Convention of 1787
 Gunning S. Bedford (1806–1870), American medical writer and teacher